Noor Abdulmajeed (Arabic: نور عبد المجيد) is an Egyptian-born Saudi author, novelist and journalist. 
She was born at Dokki district in Cairo, to Saudi parents.
She completed her primary education at Saint Joseph School in Cairo then returned to the Kingdom of Saudi Arabia where she completed her education and got her degree in English Literature from Om Al Qoura university.
Noor Abdulmajeed moved back to Cairo where she got her two diplomas, one in Education and the second in Psychology from Ain Shams University and proceeded with her professional career to the next level.

Work history

Journalism 
 1987: 1989: At "Okaz" Newspaper as a regular journalist
 2006: 2008: At "Mada" Magazine as Managing Editor
 2007: 2008: At "Rotana" Magazine as assistant Chief Editor

During her path in journalism, Noor Abdulmajeed did some prestigious interviews, including but not limited to:

 2007: Mufti Al-Azhar, Dr. Ali Gomaa 
 2007: Politician Mr. Mostafa Bakry
 2008: Egyptian Actor Mohamed AbdelQodos
 2008: The Interviewer Mr. Mofeed Fawzi

Author & novelist 
Noor Abdulmajeed commenced her career as published author & novelist in 2006.

List of Books
 2006: Cinderella came back barefoot - عادت سندريلا حافيه القدمين, 
 2008: The Great deprivation - الحرمان الكبير
 2009: Women..but - نساء ولكن
 2010: Despite parting - رغم الفراق
 2011: I want a man - اريد رجلاَ
 2012: Forbidden dreams - احلام ممنوعه
 2013: I am Chahira - انا شهيره
 2013: I am the traitor - انا الخائن
 2014: Banned memories - ذكريات محرمه
 2014: Solo - صولو
 2016: La Scala - لاسكالا
 2019: You're from me - انت مني
 2021: Dolls Whining - أنين الدمى
 2022: Kan - كان

Filmography & television 
Some of Noor's novels were converted to television series

  I want a man - اريد رجلاَ
  I am Chahira - انا شهيره
  I am the traitor - انا الخائن

References

External links 
 
 

Egyptian novelists
Egyptian women journalists
Egyptian women poets
21st-century Egyptian women writers
Living people
Year of birth missing (living people)
Female writers from Cairo
21st-century Egyptian poets